This is a list of American films that were released in 1945. In that year,  the film The Lost Weekend won Best Picture at the Academy Awards.

A

B

C

D

E

F

G

H

I

J

K

L

M

N

O

P

R

S

T

U

V

W

Y

Z

Documentaries

Serials

Shorts

See also
 1945 in the United States

References

External links

1945 films at the Internet Movie Database

1945
Films
Lists of 1945 films by country or language